Murphy's may refer to:

 Murphy's Brewery, Ireland
 Murphy's Irish Stout
 Murphy's Hotel, Richmond, Virginia, United States, demolished in 2007

See also
 Murphy's law, popular adage
 Murphy's crow, a butterfly species
 Murphy's petrel, a seabird species
 Murphys (disambiguation)